Lord Cut-Glass is the debut studio album by Lord Cut-Glass, released on 22 June 2009 on Chemikal Underground.

Track listing
All songs written by Alun Woodward.

"Even Jesus Couldn't Love You" – 4:15
"Look After Your Wife" – 4:10
"Holy Fuck!" – 3:41
"I'm A Great Example To The Dogs" – 2:18
"Monster Face" – 2:44
"You Know" – 4:04
"Be Careful What You Wish For" – 1:52
"Picasso" – 4:02
"A Pulse" – 3:42
"Big Time Teddy" – 2:53
"Toot Toot" – 3:13

Singles
"Look After Your Wife" (June 16, 2009)
"Look After Your Wife" – 3:25
"Over It" – 2:22

References

Alun Woodward albums
2009 debut albums
Chemikal Underground albums